Sacha Petshi (born 21 June 1992) is a French footballer who plays for Hapoel Afula as a defensive midfielder.

Club career
Petshi arrived to Troyes in 2007. He made his senior team debut on 11 August 2009 against Paris FC. That was his only appearance during the 2009–10 Championnat National season. In the following season, 2010–11, Petshi played regularly with Troyes B. Afterwards, he made two appearances for the first team in the 2011–12 Ligue 2 season. On 16 June 2012, Petshi signed his first professional contract with Troyes, but was immediately loaned to Orléans for the 2012–13 season.

In January 2014, Petshi joined Serbian side Sloboda Užice.  He made 9 appearances in the Serbian SuperLiga, however at the end of the season Sloboda got relegated.  Petshi left Sloboda and returned to France where he joined CA Bastia.

On 11 July 2015, he had a trial match with Blackburn Rovers against Accrington Stanley. He then signed on a one-year deal.

References

External links
 
 
 

1992 births
Living people
People from Villepinte, Seine-Saint-Denis
French footballers
French sportspeople of Ivorian descent
Association football midfielders
ES Troyes AC players
US Orléans players
FK Sloboda Užice players
CA Bastia players
Blackburn Rovers F.C. players
US Créteil-Lusitanos players
Stade Lavallois players
FK Senica players
Perak F.C. players
Rovaniemen Palloseura players
UE Engordany players
Hapoel Afula F.C. players
Ligue 2 players
Serbian SuperLiga players
Slovak Super Liga players
Malaysia Premier League players
Ykkönen players
Liga Leumit players
French expatriate footballers
Expatriate footballers in Serbia
Expatriate footballers in England
Expatriate footballers in Malaysia
Expatriate footballers in Slovakia
Expatriate footballers in Finland
Expatriate footballers in Andorra
Expatriate footballers in Israel
French expatriate sportspeople in Serbia
French expatriate sportspeople in England
French expatriate sportspeople in Malaysia
French expatriate sportspeople in Slovakia
French expatriate sportspeople in Finland
French expatriate sportspeople in Andorra
French expatriate sportspeople in Israel
Footballers from Seine-Saint-Denis